La Peccatrice dell'isola (The Island's Sinner) is a 1952 Italian melodrama film.

Cast
 Silvana Pampanini: Carla 
 Folco Lulli: Don Pietro Ingarsia 
 Vittorio Duse: Ispettore De Santis 
 John Kitzmiller: Pescatore
 Maria Grazia Francia: Maria 
 Mirella Uberti: Carmela 
 Mario Vitale: Francesco 
 Gianni Glori: Rosario

References

External links
 
 La Peccatrice dell'Isola at Variety Distribution

1952 films
1950s Italian-language films
Films directed by Sergio Corbucci
Films directed by Sergio Grieco
Italian drama films
1952 drama films
Italian black-and-white films
Melodrama films
1950s Italian films